

Sovereign states

A
 Adal – Adal Sultanate
 Algiers – Sultanate of Algiers
Alipura – Alipura
 – Principality of Andorra
 Anhalt – Principality of Anhalt
Annam – Empire of Annam
Ansbach – Principality of Ansbach
 Arakan – Kingdom of Arakan
 – Asante Union
Assam – Kingdom of Assam
 Atjeh – Aceh Sultanate
 Austria – Archduchy of Austria

B
 Baden – Margraviate of Baden
 – Kingdom of Bali
Bamana – Bamana Empire
 Banten – Sultanate of Banten
 Bavaria – Duchy of Bavaria
 – Benin Empire
 Bhonsle – Kingdom of Bhonsle
Bhutan – Kingdom of Bhutan
Bornu – Bornu Empire
 – Sultanate of Brunei
 – Brunswick-Wolfenbüttel
 Bukhara – Khanate of Bukhara
 Burma – Kingdom of Burma

C
Carnatic – Kingdom of Carnatic
Cayor – Kingdom of Cayor
Champa – Kingdom of Champa
Champasak – Kingdom of Champasak
China – Great Qing Empire
Cologne – Electorate of Cologne
Comancheria – Nʉmʉnʉʉ Sookobitʉ
 Cospaia – Republic of Cospaia
Crimea – Crimean Khanate

D
Dendi – Dendi Kingdom
 Denmark–Norway – United Kingdoms of Denmark and Norway
 Durrani – Durrani Empire

E
 – Ethiopian Empire

F
 – Kingdom of France

G
Gakhar – Kingdom of Gakhar
Garo – Kingdom of Garo
 Georgia – Kingdom of Kartli-Kakheti
 – Republic of Genoa

H
 – Free and Hanseatic City of Hamburg
 Hanover – Electorate of Hanover
Hausa – Hausa Tribe
Hedjaz – Sultanate of Hedjaz
 Hesse – Landgraviate of Hesse
 Holstein – Duchy of Holstein
 Hungary – Kingdom of Hungary
 Hyderābād – Princely state of the British Raj

I
Ijebu – Kingdom of Ijebu
 Ireland – Kingdom of Ireland

J
Janjero – Kingdom of Janjero
Japan – Tokugawa shogunate
 Johor – Johor Sultanate
Jolof – Jolof Empire

K
Kaffa – Kingdom of Kaffa
Kanem Bornu – Kanem Bornu Empire
 Kazakh – Kazakh Khanate
 Khiva – Khanate of Khiva
Khmer – Srok Khmer
Kokand – Khanate of Kokand
 Knights Hospitaller – Sovereign Order of Saint John of Jerusalem of Rhodes and of Malta, Knights of Malta, Knights of Rhodes, and Chevaliers of Malta
 Kongo – Kingdom of Kongo
 Korea – Kingdom of Great Joseon
Koya – Kingdom of Koya
Kuba – Kuba Kingdom
 – Duchy of Kurland

L
Liège – Prince-Bishopric of Liège
Loango – Kingdom of Loango
Luang Prabang – Kingdom of Luang Prabang

M
Madurai – Kingdom of Madurai
Maharashtra – Kingdom of Maharashtra
Mainz – Archbishopric of Mainz
Malacca – Sultanate of Malacca
 Malta – Order of Saint John 
Manipur – Kingdom of Manipur
 – Maratha Empire
Mataram – Mataram Sultanate
 Mecklenburg – Duchy of Mecklenburg
 Mindanao – Sultanate of Maguindanao
 Modena – Duchies of Modena and Reggio
 – Principality of Moldavia
 – Principality of Monaco
 Montenegro – Prince-Bishopric of Montenegro
 – Sultanate of Morocco
Mrauk U – Kingdom of Mrauk U
Mughal Empire – Mughal Empire
Mutapa – Empire of Mutapa
 Mysore – Kingdom of Mysore

N
 Najd – Sultanate of Najd
 Nepal – Gorkha Kingdom of Nepal
 – Republic of the Seven United Netherlands
Ngoyo – Kingdom of Ngoyo

O
 Ottoman Empire – Sublime Ottoman State
Oudh – Kingdom of Oudh
Oyo – Oyo Empire

P
Electorate of the Palatinate – States of the Church Parma – Duchy of Parma Persia – Persian Empire Polish–Lithuanian Commonwealth – Kingdom of Poland and Grand Duchy of Lithuania Portugal – Kingdom of Portugal – Kingdom of PrussiaPunjab – Punjabi Empire

R Ragusa – Republic of RagusaRajputana – Kingdom of RajputanaRapa Nui – Kingdom of Rapa NuiRozwi – Rozwi Empire Russia – Russian Empire – Kingdom of Ryūkyū

SSalzburg – Archbishopric of SalzburgSamoa – Kingdom of Samoa – Most Serene Republic of San Marino – Kingdom of Sardinia – Electorate of SaxonySennar – Funj sultanate of Sennar – Emirate of SharjahShaybanid – Khanate of Shaybanid Sicily – Kingdom of SicilySikh – Sikh ConfederacySind – Sultanate of Sind Spain – Kingdom of Spain Sulu – Sulu SultanateSwahili – Swahili Tribe Sweden – Kingdom of Sweden Switzerland – Swiss Confederation

T Teutonic Knights – Order of Brothers of the German House of Saint Mary in JerusalemTaungu – Kingdom of Taungu Thonburi – Kingdom of ThonburiTirol – County of Tirol Tonga – Tu'i TongaTonkin – Empire of Tonkin Travancore – Kingdom of TravancoreTrier – Archbishopric of TrierTripoli – Sultanate of Tripoli Tuscany – Grand Duchy of Tuscany

U
 → United Colonies (from July 4, 1776 to September 9, 1776)
United States (from September 9, 1776)

V – Most Serene Republic of VeniceVientiane – Kingdom of Vientiane

WWaalo – Kingdom of Waalo – Principality of Wallachia Württemberg – Duchy of WürttembergWürzburg – Bishopric of Würzburg

Y Yemen – Kingdom of Yemen

Non-sovereign territories
Great Britain
 British America – British America and the British West Indies

Netherlands Dutch Cape Colony''' – Cape Colony

States claiming sovereignty
Goust – Republic of  Goust

References